The Salsoul Orchestra was the backing band of session musicians for many acts on the New York City label Salsoul Records and, under its own name, recorded several hit singles and albums between 1975 and 1982.

History
The orchestra was formed in 1974 and was disbanded in 1982. Their music featured elements of Philadelphia soul, funk, Latin and disco. The Salsoul Orchestra included up to 50 members and was created and masterminded for Salsoul Records by Philadelphia musician Vincent Montana, Jr. Montana wrote, arranged, conducted, produced and played on all of the orchestra's tracks until 1978, including a gold-selling Christmas album.

The Salsoul Orchestra initially consisted of many of the original members of Philadelphia International's  MFSB, who had moved to Salsoul as the result of a disagreement with producers Kenny Gamble and Leon Huff over finances. Other members began performing as the Ritchie Family and as John Davis and the Monster Orchestra. Many large disco orchestras became popular at around the same time, including Philly's MFSB. Some may say that there were many similarities between the Salsoul Orchestra and MFSB, with whom Vincent Montana also worked. On the contrary, the Salsoul Orchestra was more of a strings-based sound while MFSB was a bit more big band in nature with five saxophones, which to Montana never sounded quite right and which he omitted from Salsoul's lineup with the exception of the baritone sax. The orchestra's biggest chart singles were 1976's reworked version of the standard "Tangerine" (pop #18, R&B #36) and "Nice 'N' Naasty" (R&B #20, pop #30) later in the same year.

When Montana left Salsoul, the orchestra recorded a final album at Sigma Sound Studios in Philadelphia mainly with producer Bunny Sigler. The orchestra's last three albums were recorded in New York City with local session players and producers, including Patrick Adams and Tom Moulton.

The orchestra's track "Love Break (Ooh I Love It)" has been sampled in rap songs such as 50 Cent's "Candyshop" and Eric B & Rakim's "Paid in Full". Also Madonna's "Vogue" used samples of the track, the inclusion of which was later the subject of a lawsuit that ended in Madonna's favor.

From December 24, 1977 to 1986, the song "Salsoul 3001" (whose intro sequence is based on Richard Strauss' "Also sprach Zarathustra") was used in the Soviet TV game What? Where? When?

Discography

Studio albums

Compilation albums

Singles

See also
Booker T and the M.G.'s
The Funk Brothers
The J.B.'s
Tower of Power horn section
The Wrecking Crew (music)
Prelude Records
Salsa

References

External links

American pop music groups
American dance music groups
Salsoul Records artists
Musical groups established in 1974
Musical groups disestablished in 1982